Early general elections were held in Guyana on 11 May 2015, alongside regional elections as a result of President Donald Ramotar proroguing the National Assembly. The result was a victory for the APNU–Alliance for Change alliance, which won 33 of the 65 seats in the National Assembly. Following the elections, APNU leader David A. Granger was sworn in as president on 16 May 2015.

Background
Early elections were called as a result of a stand-off between President Donald Ramotar and the National Assembly; after the President had defied spending cuts imposed by the National Assembly, the legislature called for a motion of no confidence. Ramotar subsequently suspended the National Assembly in November 2014 and dissolved it three months later. Ramotar announced the election date on 20 January 2015.

Electoral system
The 65 elected members of the National Assembly were elected using closed list proportional representation from a single nationwide 40-seat constituency and 10 sub-national constituencies with a total of 25 seats. Seats are allocated using the Hare quota.

The President was elected by a first-past-the-post double simultaneous vote system, whereby each list nominated a presidential candidate and the presidential election itself was won by the candidate of the list having a plurality.

Results

National Assembly

By region

Regional assemblies

Notes

References

External links
Guyana Elections Commission

Elections in Guyana
Guyana
Guyana
2015 in Guyana